Robert M. Savini born Robert Madison Florett Savini August 29, 1886 in New Orleans, Louisiana, died April 29, 1956 (age 69) in New York City, New York, was an American film distributor. producer and head of Astor Pictures.

Biography
Savini first entered the American motion picture world by becoming a theatre usher in August, 1904. He worked his way up to being a theatre owner, and became a film distributor.

In 1932 he became an assistant to William Saal of Sono Art-World Wide Pictures.  The following year Saal and Savini teamed up to form Amnity Pictures in May 1933 until Savini formed his Astor Pictures in  October 1933.  The film distribution company was named for the Hotel Astor in New York City where Savini was then residing. Savini claimed that World Wide Pictures changed its name to Atlantic Pictures in late 1935 and he would continue as its sales manager.

For over two decades Astor acquired screening rights of various previously released films to release as double features at neighborhood theaters.  Sometimes Astor would "streamline" the older films by editing them to fit is as part of a double feature and often gave them new and more exciting titles.  He also provided films in 16 mm to small cinemas and clubs for screening as well as for home use.

Astor distributed many race films and organised a Broadway premiere for Oscar Micheaux's The Betrayal (1948).

Savini's Atlantic Pictures became Atlantic Television in 1950 which sold screening rights to several of their films for television showing.  With the supply of older feature films for re-release drying up, Savini acquired film screening rights for many British and foreign language films and produced several new science fiction films such as Cat Women of the Moon.

Bibliography
  Pitts, Michael R. Astor Pictures: A Filmography and History of the Reissue King, 1933-1965 McFarland, 12 Apr 2019

References

External links
 

1886 births
1956 deaths
Film producers from Louisiana
20th-century American businesspeople